Fortaleza is a city in Brazil.

Fortaleza or variations such as La Fortaleza may also refer to:

Castles or fortresses
Fortaleza del Cerro, a fortress in Montevideo, Uruguay.
Fortaleza Ozama, a sixteenth-century castle in Santo Domingo, Dominican Republic.
Fortaleza Ruin (Gila Bend, Arizona), listed on the NRHP in Maricopa County, Arizona
La Fortaleza, in San Juan, Puerto Rico, listed on the NRHP in Puerto Rico
Guia Fortress, in Macao, China, also known as Fortaleza de Guia
Fortaleza de Jagua, fortress south of Cienfuegos in Cuba
Fortaleza de San Carlos de La Cabaña, in Havana, Cuba

Municipalities
Fortaleza de Minas, a Brazilian municipality located in the southwest of the state of Minas Gerais.
Fortaleza dos Nogueiras,  a municipality in the state of Maranhão in the Northeast region of Brazil.
Fortaleza do Tabocão, a municipality in the state of Tocantins in the Northern region of Brazil.
Fortaleza dos Valos, a municipality in the state Rio Grande do Sul, Brazil.

Rivers
Fortaleza River, a river in southern Brazil.
Fortaleza River (Peru), a river in northern Peru

Sport
Fortaleza Esporte Clube, Brazilian football club
Fortaleza F.C., Colombian football club